The miracle of the gulls is an 1848 event often credited by Latter-day Saints ("Mormons") for saving the Mormon pioneers' second harvest in the Salt Lake Valley. While absent in contemporary accounts, later accounts claimed seagulls miraculously saved the 1848 crops by eating thousands of insects that were devouring their fields.  The first crop was planted in 1847 a few days after they entered the valley, which was very late in the growing season and produced a meager but usable harvest. Next spring, using seed from the first harvest, they planted their second crop, only to watch in dismay as the crickets attacked. Less than two years earlier, in October 1846, many of them were saved by quail that flew into their camp, on their trek to the Great Salt Lake and made available as food.

Traditional story

After Brigham Young led the first band of Latter-day Saints into what is now Salt Lake City, Utah, the pioneers had the good fortune of a relatively mild winter. Although late frosts in April and May destroyed some of the crops, the pioneers seemed to be well on their way to self-sufficiency. However, large swarms of insects appeared in the valley beginning in late May.

These insects, now called "Mormon crickets" because of this incident, are not true crickets, but instead belong to the katydid family. Having ornamental wings, they are unable to fly, but instead can travel in huge swarms. Mormon crickets eat all plant material in their path, but they also eat any insects that die on the way, including their own species. They are known to cyclically swarm in some areas of the Mountain West, especially in Utah and Nevada. These insects threatened the livelihood of the Mormon pioneers; stomping on the pests did not dissuade them from entering farms as others would advance. This is a reproductive strategy similar to mast reproduction in oaks, overwhelming predators with sheer numbers allowing a percentage of the population to survive to reproduce. Latter-day Saints often cast this disaster in Biblical terms like the 8th plague of locusts.

According to traditional accounts, legions of gulls appeared by 1848 June 9 following fervent prayers by the pioneer farmers. It is said that these birds, native to the Great Salt Lake, ate mass quantities of crickets, drank some water, regurgitated, and continued eating more crickets over a two-week period. The pioneers saw the gulls' arrival as a miracle, and the story was recounted from the pulpit by church leaders such as Orson Pratt and George A. Smith. The traditional story is that the seagulls annihilated the insects, ensuring the survival of some 4,000 Mormon pioneers who had traveled to Utah. For this reason, Seagull Monument was erected and the California gull is the state bird of Utah.

Historical review

Seagulls did come and eat many of the crickets in 1848. However, several things should be noted regarding the event, specifically regarding how common the event was and how people perceived the event at the time.
 
 Records predating the arrival of the Mormon pioneers show that various types of gulls, including the California gull, inhabited the Great Salt Lake area. These gulls fed on various insects, including crickets.
 Gulls regurgitate the indigestible parts of insects, similar to how an owl regurgitates pellets. While this behavior seemed strange to the pioneers, it is normal for gulls.
 The crickets did major damage to the crops prior to the arrival of the gulls. Then after the arrival of the gulls, even after weeks of the gulls feasting on the crickets, the crickets were still a massive problem.
 The damage to the crops in 1848 were due to frost, crickets, and drought, and the gulls only had a minor impact on one of those factors.
 There are no known records contemporary with the event which describe the event as miraculous or as a miracle. The First Presidency of the church, while mentioning the crop damage, frost, and crickets, made no mention of the gulls at all in their official summary of the first few years of the Mormons living in the Salt Lake Valley. 
 Gulls regularly returned to feast on the crickets for years afterwards (and presumably for years before), making 1848 unremarkable.

See also
 List of individual birds

Notes

References

Leonard Arrington & Davis Bitton, The Mormon Experience at 104 (Alfred A. Knopf, 1979).
.
.
.
.
.
.

1848 in the United States
The Church of Jesus Christ of Latter-day Saints in Utah
Pre-statehood history of Utah
History of the Church of Jesus Christ of Latter-day Saints
Natural history of Utah
Christian miracles
Latter Day Saint terms
1848 in Christianity
Gulls
19th-century Mormonism
June 1848 events
Insects in religion
Birds in religion